is a railway station located in Higashimachi (東町), Kenbuchi, Kamikawa District (Ishikari), Hokkaidō. It is operated by the Hokkaido Railway Company. The station ic closed from 13 March 2021 due to extremely low usage.

Lines served
Hokkaido Railway Company
Sōya Main Line

Adjacent stations

External links
Ekikara Time Table - JR Higashi-Rokusen Station 

Railway stations in Hokkaido Prefecture
Railway stations in Japan opened in 1959
Railway stations closed in 2021